Peranamallur is a state assembly constituency in Tamil Nadu in present-day Tiruvanamalai district since 1989, prior to that was part of North Arcot district. Elections and winners in the constituency are listed below.

Madras State

Tamil Nadu

Election results

2006

2001

1996

1991

1989

1984

1980

1977

1971

1967

1962

References

External links
 

Former assembly constituencies of Tamil Nadu
Tiruvannamalai district